The 2000–01 NBA season was the 55th season for the Boston Celtics in the National Basketball Association. During the off-season, the Celtics acquired Bryant Stith from the Denver Nuggets, and signed free agents Randy Brown, Chris Carr, and rookie center Mark Blount. Prior to the start of the season, the Celtics were nearly hit with tragedy when Paul Pierce was stabbed 11 times in the face, neck and back, and had a bottle smashed over his head, and was attacked by three men at the Buzz Club, a late night dance club in the Boston Theater District on September 25, 2000; Tony Battie, Pierce's Celtic teammate, along with Battie's brother, saved him by rushing him to a nearby hospital, where Pierce had to undergo lung surgery to repair the damage. Nevertheless, Pierce was the only Celtic to start all 82 games during the 2000–01 season.

The Celtics played around .500 in November, but then struggled as Kenny Anderson only played just 33 games due to an ankle injury and broken jaw, and Battie only played just 40 games due to an ankle injury. With a 12–22 start to the season, a frustrated Rick Pitino resigned as head coach after three years with the Celtics. Under replacement Jim O'Brien, they played around .500 for the remainder of the season posting a six-game winning streak between January and February, but later lost six of their final eight games, finishing fifth in the Atlantic Division with a 36–46 record, missing the playoffs for the sixth consecutive season. In the 39 years before the current streak, they had missed the playoffs only five times.

Pierce averaged 25.3 points, 6.4 rebounds and 1.7 steals per game, while Antoine Walker averaged 23.4 points, 8.9 rebounds, 5.5 assists per game, and led the league with 221 three-point field goals, Stith contributed 9.7 points per game, and Vitaly Potapenko provided the team with 7.5 points and 6.0 rebounds per game off the bench. Following the season, Stith signed as a free agent with the Cleveland Cavaliers, while second-year guard Adrian Griffin signed with the Dallas Mavericks, and Carr was released to free agency.

Draft picks

Roster

Regular season

Season standings

Record vs. opponents

Game log

Player statistics

Awards and records

Transactions

See also
2000–01 NBA season
Reebok Pro Summer League, a summer league hosted by the Celtics

References

Boston Celtics seasons
Boston Celtics
Boston Celtics
Boston Celtics
Celtics
Celtics